The 1929 Grand Banks earthquake (also called the Laurentian Slope earthquake and the South Shore Disaster) occurred on November 18, 1929. The shock had a moment magnitude of 7.2 and a maximum Rossi–Forel intensity of VI (Strong tremor) and was centered in the Atlantic Ocean off the south coast of Newfoundland in the Laurentian Slope Seismic Zone.

Earthquake
It was felt as far away as New York City and Montreal. It snapped 12 submarine transatlantic telegraph cables and led to a tsunami that arrived in three waves. Newfoundland, Canada and Saint Pierre and Miquelon had the largest impact, both from the snapped 12 submarine cables, and the tsunami. This was Canada's largest submarine landslide ever recorded, up to 500 times the size of 1894 Saint-Alban subaerial slide.

In 2002 Natural Resources Canada and the United States Geological Survey, created an intensity map by using the Revised Modified Mercalli scale.

Tsunami
It destroyed many south coastal communities on the Peninsula, killing 27 or 28 people and leaving 1,000 or more homeless. All means of communication were cut off by the destruction, and relief efforts were further hampered by a blizzard that struck the day after. It took 2 hours and 23 minutes to strike Burin, Newfoundland,  from the epicentre, and only two hours to be observed in Bermuda .

Prince Edward Island
Prince Edward Island felt the earthquake; at the time the intensity was rated at IV (Slight tremor) – VI (Strong tremor) on the Rossi-Forel scale. In PEI it ranged from an intensity of III (Weak) – V (Moderate).

Saint Pierre and Miquelon
At 17:20, the tsunami reached the island of Saint-Pierre, submerging the docks. The worst damage was reported on the island then named Île-aux-Chiens (meaning Island of the Dogs; till 1931), now known as L'Île-aux-Marins (The Island of the Sailors). The tsunami hit from the south, rising above the height of the south bank that protects the south coast, flooding the lower part of the island. It damaged and moved some of the houses; there were no reported injuries or casualties from the islands. The quake's intensity on the island was V (Moderate tremor) – VI (Strong tremor), and on the revised Modified Mercalli Intensity scale IV (Light) – V (Moderate)

Aftermath 

It took more than three days before the SS Meigle responded to an SOS signal with doctors, nurses, blankets, and food. Donations from across Newfoundland, Canada, the United States and United Kingdom totaled $250,000. There was never an accurate official list of the victims produced by any branch of the Newfoundland government.  In the report entitled "Loss of Life," the Honourable Dr. Harris Munden Mosdell, Chairman of the Board of Health Burin West, reported: "The loss of life through the tidal wave totals twenty-seven.  Twenty-five deaths were due directly to the upheaval. Two other deaths occurred subsequently and were due to shock and exposure."  Later research attributed an additional death to the earthquake.

In 1952, American scientists from Columbia University put together the pieces of the sequentially broken cables that led to the discovery of the landslide and the first documentation of a turbidity current. Scientists have examined other layers of sand believed to be deposited by other tsunamis in an effort to determine the occurrence rates of large earthquakes. The occurrences of large tsunamis, such as the one in 1929, are dependent upon deposition of sediments offshore because it was the landslide that made the tsunami so powerful. It will take a while before there is a large enough deposition of sediments to form an underwater landslide of a size similar as that of 1929.

See also
List of earthquakes in 1929
List of earthquakes in Canada
List of historical tsunamis

References

Citations

Sources

External links
Archival moment: Tsunami hits Burin Peninsula - CBC
The Magnitude 7.2 1929 "Grand Banks" earthquake and tsunami – Natural Resources Canada
The South Shore disaster: Newfoundland's tsunami
Not Too Long Ago (first hand accounts of the tsunami, pp. 51–60)
Newfoundland Tsunami – November 18, 1929 – Library and Archives Canada
Marine Geology Volume 215, Issues 1–2 International Journal of Marine geology, Geochemistry and Geophysics (2004)

Further reading
Tsunami: The Newfoundland Tidal Wave Disaster – Maura Hanrahan (2004) 

Earthquakes in Newfoundland and Labrador
Natural disasters in Nova Scotia
Natural disasters in Prince Edward Island
1929 in Saint Pierre and Miquelon
Grand Banks earthquake
Grand Banks earthquake
Grand Banks earthquake
Grand Banks earthquake
Grand Banks earthquake
Grand Banks earthquake
Grand Banks earthquake